Mount Orhy (French), also Ori or Orhi in Spanish and Basque, is a mountain at the border of Navarre and Soule, in the Pyrenees, and is  high. It is the westernmost peak above  in the entire range.

A prominent mountain, it is very important in Basque mythology. Its grassy slopes are used as pastures.

References
 El Correo (Spanish)

Mountains of the Pyrenees
Mountains of Pyrénées-Atlantiques
Mountains of Navarre
International mountains of Europe
France–Spain border
Two-thousanders of France
Two-thousanders of Spain